Amandine Buchard  (born 12 July 1995) is a French judoka. She represented France at the 2020 Summer Olympics and won the silver medal in the half lightweight event, and a gold medal in the mixed team event.

Career
She won a bronze medal at the 2014 World Judo Championships in Chelyabinsk.

She was junior world champion in 2014, having won the 2014 World Judo Junior Championships.

In 2019, she won the silver medal in the women's 52 kg event at the 2019 Judo World Masters held in Qingdao, China. In 2021, she won the gold medal in her event at the 2021 Judo World Masters held in Doha, Qatar. At the 2021 Judo Grand Slam Abu Dhabi held in Abu Dhabi, United Arab Emirates, she won the gold medal in her event.

She won the gold medal in her event at the 2022 Judo Grand Slam Paris held in Paris, France.

Personal life
She is openly lesbian.

References

External links

 
 

1995 births
Living people
French female judoka
Sportspeople from Seine-Saint-Denis
Judoka at the 2019 European Games
European Games medalists in judo
European Games bronze medalists for France
Medalists at the 2020 Summer Olympics
Judoka at the 2020 Summer Olympics
Olympic judoka of France
Olympic gold medalists for France
Olympic silver medalists for France
French LGBT sportspeople
21st-century French LGBT people
Olympic medalists in judo
21st-century French women